McQuay is a surname. Notable people with the surname include:

Herb McQuay (1948–2005), American singer
Kevin McQuay (1949–2005), Australian businessman
Leon McQuay (1950–1995), American football player
Leon McQuay III (born 1994), American football player
Mike McQuay (1949–1995), American science fiction writer
Stan McQuay (born 1973), American bodybuilder
Tony McQuay (born 1990), American sprinter and silver medalist at the 2012 Olympic Games

See also
McQuay International, an HVAC manufacturing company
McQuay-Norris, a defunct auto parts manufacturer and supplier